Virgin Money US (formerly CircleLending) was a peer-to-peer loans and loan-servicing company which was for a short time part of Virgin Money.

History

Foundation 
CircleLending was founded in Cambridge, Massachusetts in May 2000 by Asheesh Advani and launched in 2001. The company was then incorporated as CircleLending, Inc. in July 2002. In 2005 the company moved to Waltham, Massachusetts. In 2006, the company received venture capital from Venrock Associates, Bezos Expeditions and Omidyar Network totalling $10 million.

Acquisition by Virgin 
In 2007, the Virgin Group acquired a majority-stake in the company and renamed it Virgin Money Holdings USA Inc., the American division of Virgin Money.
Virgin Money US focused solely on formalizing and servicing loans between friends and family, a business model which differentiated it from later social lending and crowdfunding businesses which encouraged loans between strangers.

In 2008 the company bought Lendia, and renamed it Virgin Money USA Inc., but sold it back to its founder, Greg O'Connor, the following year. O'Connor's company, formerly Lendia, continues to operate as Clearpoint Funding, Inc.

Closure and legacy 
Founder Advani left the company in 2009. In 2010, during the financial crisis of 2007–2010, Virgin Money began its withdrawal from the US market. Virgin Money US withdrew from the US market entirely in November 2010. Servicing of its social loans was transferred to its servicing partner, Graystone Solutions, who continue to service the social loans under their own brand.

In 2010 a former Virgin Money US employee launched a new venture, National Family Mortgage, to address the intrafamily real estate loan void created by Virgin's departure.

References 

Virgin Money
Peer-to-peer lending companies
Financial services companies established in 2000
Companies based in Massachusetts